The Ordine dei Dottori Commercialisti e degli Esperti Contabili (ODCEC) (Italian for "Professional order of tax advisors") is the Italian professional accounting body offering the  and  qualifications.

History 

Both decrees were abolished by Legislative Decree No 139/2005, so the members of the territorial orders and local colleges were transferred to section A of ODCEC's professional register and it is now impossible to become a commercialista without a laurea magistrale.

References 

Professional associations based in Italy
2008 establishments in Italy